The suspensory ligament of the ovary, also infundibulopelvic ligament (commonly abbreviated IP ligament or simply IP), is a fold of peritoneum that extends out from the ovary to the wall of the pelvis.

Some sources consider it a part of the broad ligament of uterus while other sources just consider it a "termination" of the ligament. It is not considered a true ligament in that it does not physically support any anatomical structures; however it is an important landmark and it houses the ovarian vessels.

The suspensory ligament is directed upward over the iliac vessels.

Structure
It contains the ovarian artery, ovarian vein, ovarian nerve plexus, and lymphatic vessels.

Composition
The suspensory ligament of the ovary is one continuous tissue that connects the ovary to the wall of the pelvis. There are separate names for the two regions of this tissue. 
 In the anterior region, the suspensory ligament is attached to the wall of the pelvis via a continuous tissue called peritoneum. 
 In the more posterior region, the suspensory ligament is attached to the upper pole of ovary and infundibulum of fallopian tube via a continuous tissue called the broad ligament.

In sum, the suspensory ligament consists of a single connective tissue that has different regional notations, the peritoneum and the broad ligament.

Peritoneal relationship

Most of the abdominal cavity is lined by a double-membranous sac called peritoneum .  The interior is called the peritoneal cavity, this is the location of all 'intra-peritoneal' organs (disambiguation: retro-peritoneal organs ).    The most inferior extent of the peritoneum covers the pelvic inlet; in females, this region of the peritoneum is referred to as the 'broad ligament'.

Development
The suspensory ligament originates from the mesonephros, which, in turn, originates from intermediate mesoderm.

The prenatal development of the suspensory ligament of the ovary is a part of the development of the reproductive system.

See also
 Ligament of ovary

References

External links
 
 
 Slide at pitt.edu

Ligaments
Mammal female reproductive system